Carl Persson (born 28 June 1995) is a Swedish professional ice hockey forward. He is currently playing with the Malmö Redhawks of the Swedish Hockey League (SHL).

Playing career
Undrafted, Persson played as a youth with Tingsryds AIF at the J20 SuperElit level. Persson made his Swedish Hockey League debut playing with HV71 during the 2014–15 SHL season.

After two seasons in the HockeyAllsvenskan with BIK Karlskoga, Persson returned to the SHL in signing a two-year contract with Karlskrona HK on 30 March 2017. In the 2017–18 season, Persson finished third on Karlskrona with 24 points in 52 games in his first full season in the SHL.

Unable to prevent Karlskrona HK from relegation to the HockeyAllsvenksan, Persson invoked an NHL release clause, in signing a two-year, entry-level contract with the Nashville Predators on 9 May 2018. After attending the Predators training camp, Persson found himself beginning the 2018–19 season with the Predators secondary affiliate, the Atlanta Gladiators of the ECHL. After contributing 3 points in 6 games and unable to progress to the AHL, Persson agreed to a mutual termination of his contract with the Predators, immediately returning to sign a two-year contract with the Malmö Redhawks of the SHL on 9 November 2018.

Career statistics

References

External links

1995 births
Living people
Atlanta Gladiators players
BIK Karlskoga players
HV71 players
Karlskrona HK players
Malmö Redhawks players
Swedish ice hockey forwards
Tingsryds AIF players
People from Kristianstad Municipality
Sportspeople from Skåne County